The 2014 German Athletics Championships were held at the Donaustadion in Ulm on 26–27 July 2014.

Results

Men

Women

Notes

References

External links 

 Official website of the Deutscher Leichtathletik-Verband (DLV; German Athletics Association) 
 Full results 
 Medallists 

2014
2014 in athletics (track and field)
2014 in German sport